Edward R. "Ed" Lukowich (born March 1, 1946; nicknamed "Cool Hand Luke") is a former Canadian champion curler. Lukowich is a two-time Brier champion, having won the Brier Tankard for Alberta as skip of both the 1978 and 1986 Canadian championship teams.

Career

Curling
Born on March 1, 1946, in Speers, Saskatchewan, Lukowich was the athlete development director from 2000 to 2009 of the United States Curling Association. He coached the Pete Fenson rink at the 2010 World Championship at Cortina d'Ampezzo to a 4th-place finish.

Lukowich has written four books on curling and produced a 60-minute instructional video. He was one of the initial founders of the TSN Skins Game and a co-founder of and former executive director of the World Curling Tour. He also was the WCT colour-commentator for CTV Sportsnet.

Writing
Lukowich changed careers in 2011,
becoming a science fiction writer as well as the author of 5 books (in his Trillion Theory series) relating to new theory pertaining to the age and origin of our universe.

Authored books:
The Trillionist 2013 (science fiction novel published by EDGE).
Trillion Theory (2015)(1st book in the Trillion Theory series.
Trillion Years Universe Theory (2014 and 2015)(2nd book in the Trillion Theory series.
Black Holes Built Our Cosmos (2015)(3rd book in the Trillion Theory series.
T Theory Says: Who Owns our Universe (2016)(4th book in the Trillion Theory series.
Spinning Black Hole Inside Our Earth (2017)(5th book in the Trillion Theory series.

Personal life
A resident of Calgary, Ed is the older brother of former NHL hockey player, Morris Lukowich. His cousin is NHL player Brad Lukowich who is the son of former NHL and WHA player Bernie Lukowich.

Sources
Interview at inthehack.com

References

External links

 Video: 

Curlers from Saskatchewan
Curlers from Calgary
1946 births
Living people
Curling broadcasters
Brier champions
Medalists at the 1988 Winter Olympics
Olympic bronze medalists for Canada
Canadian male curlers
World curling champions